Christian Lucatero (born June 17, 1997) is an American soccer player.

Career

Youth 
Lucatero joined the Houston Dynamo academy in 2010. He was named the 2013 and 2015 Dynamo Academy Player of the Year, as well as winning the 2014 Dynamo Academy Players' Player of the Year award and 2014-15 U.S. Soccer Development Academy Central Conference Player of the Year. Lucatero scored 41 goals in his 54 appearances with the Dynamo U-18s.

Professional 
On August 18, 2015 Lucatero signed a homegrown player contract with the Dynamo. He is the seventh Homegrown Player in Dynamo history. Lucatero had previously committed to play college soccer at Oregon State University before accepting the Dynamo's contract.

Lucatero was sent on loan to Houston's United Soccer League affiliate club Rio Grande Valley FC in March 2016. He made his professional debut on April 12, 2016, coming on as an 86th-minute substitute during a 2–2 draw against Seattle Sounders FC 2. Lucatero would make 18 appearances for the Toros in 2016, however he only got 271 minutes.

On March 23, 2017, Lucatero was sent on a season long loan to the Toros.

After Houston declined Lucatero's option at the end of the 2017 season. He signed with Liga MX side Club Necaxa on 9 January 2018.

On March 7, 2020, Lucatero returned to the United States and rejoined Rio Grande Valley FC.

Personal life
Lucatero holds a Mexican passport, as both his parents were born in Mexico.

Career Statistics

References

External links
 

1997 births
Living people
American soccer players
American sportspeople of Mexican descent
Houston Dynamo FC players
Rio Grande Valley FC Toros players
Club Necaxa footballers
USL Championship players
Soccer players from Texas
People from Houston
United States men's under-20 international soccer players
Association football midfielders
Homegrown Players (MLS)